The first season of Workin' Moms, the Canadian comedy television series, was greenlit by CBC in October 2015.

Workin' Moms is a Canadian television sitcom that premiered on CBC Television on January 10, 2017. The show stars Catherine Reitman, Jessalyn Wanlim, Dani Kind, Enuka Okuma, and Juno Rinaldi as a group of friends dealing with the challenges of being working mothers. The series is produced by Wolf + Rabbit Entertainment, the production company of Reitman and her husband, Philip Sternberg.

Cast

Starring
 Catherine Reitman as Kate Foster
 Dani Kind as Anne Carlson
 Juno Rinaldi as Frankie Coyne
 Jessalyn Wanlim as Jenny Matthews
 Philip Sternberg as Nathan Foster
 Ryan Belleville as Lionel Carlson
 Sadie Munroe as Alice Carlson
 Dennis Andres as Ian Matthews

Recurring
 Sarah McVie as Valerie "Val" Szalinsky
 Katherine Barrell as Alicia Rutherford
 Peter Keleghan as Richard Greenwood
 Nikki Duval as Rosie Phillips
 Kevin Vidal as Mo Daniels
 Jann Arden as Jane Carlson
 Oluniké Adeliyi as Giselle Bois
 Jess Salgueiro as Mean Nanny/Renya
 Novie Edwards as Sheila
 Jennifer Pudavick as Gena Morris
 Alden Adair as Marvin Grimes

Guest
 Mary Ashton as Sarah Hoffman

Episodes

Reception
On Rotten Tomatoes, season 1 has an approval rating of 77% based on reviews from 13 critics.

References

External links
 
 

2015 Canadian television seasons
Workin' Moms
2017 Canadian television series debuts
2010s Canadian workplace comedy television series
2017 Canadian television seasons